Khorramdasht is a city and capital of Khorramdasht District, in Takestan County, Qazvin Province, Iran. At the 2006 census its population was 6,192, in 1,590 families. The people of this city are Persian.

References 

Populated places in Takestan County
Cities in Qazvin Province